The Opposition Front Bench in Ireland are the front (and most visible) benches of the parties outside the Government.

Since the 2020 general election, the following parties occupy the front benches on the opposition side:
Sinn Féin Front Bench
Labour Party Front Bench
Social Democrats Front Bench
Solidarity–People Before Profit Front Bench

See also
Front bench (Ireland)
Technical group

References

Politics of the Republic of Ireland
Parliamentary opposition
Oireachtas
Front benches in the Oireachtas
Ireland